Henry Addison Deland (October 25, 1834 — March 13, 1908) was a baking soda manufacturer from Fairport, New York who first visited Persimmon Hollow, Florida March 1876. The community where his brother-in-law, O.P. Terry had purchased property to raise oranges intrigued him. So did the name chosen thus for the persimmon trees abundant in the area.  

On DeLand's first visit to the hollow he and his brother-in-law traveled from the north by rail to Jacksonville, then took a steamboat up the St. Johns River to Enterprise. As their rig headed to the hollow DeLand was unenthusiastic during his bumpy ride from Enterprise but as the flat terrain transitioned from swamp to rolling acreage it was reported that DeLand exclaimed, "This looks like the West. Here is snap and push. I am willing to go on." And he did. 

High noon, February 8, 1882, the town known as Persimmon Hollow, Florida was incorporated by a unanimous vote of its 23 townspeople. Persimmon Hollow's name change took place after the generous donation of acreage for a school, church, and main thoroughfare by DeLand.  DeLand took great interest and pride in his new Florida enterprise and intended to make it the Athens of Florida as he dubbed it. DeLand founded the DeLand Academy which soon became known as  John B. Stetson University, after he persuaded his friend, the millionaire hat maker John B. Stetson, to come to DeLand and invest in the institution. 

Around this same time, Henry DeLand suffered a severe financial loss in the freeze. He'd promised that anyone who moved to the area and planted oranges and then lost their crop to a freeze would have their financial investment covered by him. But as time passed, the city he founded continued to develop and thrive. It has remained the county seat of Volusia County since 1887, and today has an estimated population of around 37,000.

References

External links
"Images of America: DeLand" by Maggi Smith Hall, Michael Justin Holder, Arcadia Publishing, 2003

Encyclopædia Britannica article
World Population Review

1834 births
1908 deaths
People from DeLand, Florida
People from Fairport, New York